Pseudohecyra lutulenta is a species of beetle in the family Cerambycidae, and the only species in the genus Pseudohecyra. It was described by Gestro in 1892.

References

Crossotini
Beetles described in 1892
Monotypic beetle genera